Poonam Rani (born 8 February 1993) is an Indian field hockey player from Hisar, Haryana who was selected to represent India at the 2016 Olympics. She is said to have been inspired to play hockey after watching the India win the gold medal at the 2002 Commonwealth Games in Manchester, England.

See also
 List of Indian sportswomen

References

External links

1993 births
Living people
Indian female field hockey players
21st-century Indian women
21st-century Indian people
Asian Games medalists in field hockey
Asian Games bronze medalists for India
Field hockey players at the 2010 Asian Games
Field hockey players at the 2014 Asian Games
Field hockey players at the 2016 Summer Olympics
Field hockey players from Haryana
Medalists at the 2014 Asian Games
Olympic field hockey players of India
Sportswomen from Haryana
Field hockey players at the 2010 Commonwealth Games
Field hockey players at the 2014 Commonwealth Games
Field hockey players at the 2018 Commonwealth Games
Commonwealth Games competitors for India